The Shoulder of Shasta is a romance novel by Bram Stoker written in 1895. It was published two years before the release of Stoker's Dracula.  The book is set in the American West.  It was written after one of the American tours he did with Henry Irving.

Main characters
Esse Elstree
Grizzly Dick - family's guide
Mrs. Elstree - Esse's mother
Miss Gimp - Esse's governess

References

1895 British novels
Constable & Co. books
Irish romance novels
Novels by Bram Stoker